Shondikha is a rural locality (a village) in Yugo-Kamskoye Rural Settlement, Permsky District, Perm Krai, Russia. The population was 10 as of 2010.

Geography 
Shondikha is located 78 km southwest of Perm (the district's administrative centre) by road. Zhilya is the nearest rural locality.

References 

Rural localities in Permsky District